Pocasset Firehouse No. 7 is a historic former fire station in Fall River, Massachusetts. Built in 1873, it is one of four extant firehouses within the city designed by Boston architects Hartwell & Swasey in the Ruskinian Gothic style. The others include the Quequechan No. 1 on Prospect Street, the Massasoit No. 5 on Freedom Street, the Anawan No. 6 Firehouse on North Main Street.

In 1895, an extension was built on the west side of the main structure to accommodate of a hook and ladder truck. A portion of the building was used as a police station. The Pocasset Firehouse was built to serve the Flint Village section of the city. It operated as a fire station until 1988, when the Flint Reney/Eastwood Fire Station opened on Eastern Avenue.

The station was added to the National Register of Historic Places in 1983. It now privately owned, and occupied by Baker Sign Works.

See also
National Register of Historic Places listings in Fall River, Massachusetts

References

Fire stations completed in 1873
Fire stations on the National Register of Historic Places in Massachusetts
Buildings and structures in Fall River, Massachusetts
National Register of Historic Places in Fall River, Massachusetts
Defunct fire stations in Massachusetts